A Chinese compound surname is a Chinese surname using more than one character. Many of these compound surnames derive from Zhou dynasty Chinese noble and official titles, professions, place names and other areas, to serve a purpose. Some are originally from various tribes that lived in ancient China, while others were created by joining two one-character family names. Only a few of these names (e.g. Ouyang [歐陽/欧阳], Shangguan [上官], Sima [司馬/司马], Zhuge [諸葛/诸葛], Situ [司徒], Xiahou [夏侯], Huangfu [皇甫], and Huyan [呼延]) can still be found quite commonly in modern times with Ouyang, Shangguan, Sima and Situ appearing most frequently. Many clans eventually took on a single-character surname for various reasons. Chinese surnames with more than two characters are mostly not of ethnic Chinese origin (e.g. Xianbei or Turkic), and are becoming exceedingly rare to find, but are still in use today.

Lists below are arranged alphabetically by their Mandarin pinyin spellings.

Native Chinese compound surnames

Double-barrelled surnames
Double-barrelled surname occurs sometimes when both families of a marriage wish to pass down their surnames, or when a child wishes to commemorate both the biological and foster parents. This is often distinguished from compound surnames, which cannot be split into two single-character surnames. A doubled-barrelled surname is also distinguished from a married name, as married names are not passed down to the next generations.

Non-Han surnames
Peoples other than Han have resided in China and have their names transliterated into Chinese. A large number of these non-Han surnames contain more than one Chinese character.

See also

Chinese surname
Japanese surname
Korean surname
Vietnamese name

External links 
The Ten-Thousand Families of Surnames from Netor (NETOR纪念:万家姓氏) (in simplified Chinese only)